Vojtěch Sedláček (born 1947 in Prague) is a Czech entrepreneur, who established Obsluzna spol. (1995) and Agentura ProVas (1996). Both companies have a mission of creating employment and business opportunities for people with disabilities. In 1973 Vojtech Sedlacek married with Jaroslava Vagnerova (maiden name), they raised four daughters and one son.

Biography
In 1969, Vojtech Sedlacek began working as a technician and programmer of central computers, at Works of Industry Automatization in Cakovice. Subsequently before the Velvet Revolution in 1989, he worked in software department at the Research Institute of Mathematical Machines. Since 1981 until 1989 he also volunteered as an instructor of informational technology in the school of Jedlicka for handicapped children. In 1990 he became the mayor of city of Roztoky and was elected by the assembly as a representative of the Civic Forum. In 1991, he was appointed as the head of the office of the Czech government. From the year 1992 he worked as the executive director and a member of the board of trustees for a printing company CTK Repro. In 1995 he was elected as the board president and executive director of a Citizen Pension Fund. In 1998 he worked as the deputy minister of internal security.

Professional affiliations and honors
In 1977, he was among the first people to sign Charter 77. In 2006, he was the national winner of the competition for the social entrepreneur of the year. In 2007 he was among the first to sign a petition Ligy against antisemitism. In 2008 he became a member of the World Entrepreneurship Forum and he participated at its conference in Evian, France. In 2010 he became a member of the World Economic Forum and he participated at its conference in Brussels, Belgium. Kepler museum in Prague was realised by his Agentura ProVas in 2009. Vojtech Sedlacek is member of Czech Astronomical Society.
In 2015 he received Via Bona Award in category The Forging a New Path for innovative support homeless people - project ROOF FIRST.
Since 2014 is commissioned by Executive Committee of Czech Astronomy Society to lead an Expert Group of Historical Astronomy
On the occasion of the 100th anniversary (2018) of its foundation, the Czech Astronomical Society awarded the Honorable Mention for a great merits in the field of astronomy.
In 2020, he founded the innovative At Home First project, which helps socially sustainable living.
Since 2020, he has been a member of the board of the Committee of Good Will - Olga Havel Foundation. Since 2021, he has been The Chairman of the Management Board of Good Will – Olga Havel Foundation.

Publications
 Sedláček, Vojtěch, The Astronomical Clock in Prague,

External links
 Web Agentura ProVas
 The League Against Antisemitism
 The Award for Outstanding Social Entrepreneurship
 Web Kepler museum in Prague
 World Entrepreneurship Forum website
 Vojtěch Sedláček - CURRICULUM VITAE, personal website, Czech + English
 Vojtěch Sedláček: Memory of nations
 Web Roof First
 Web At Home First
 Web Olga Havel Foundation

References

Businesspeople from Prague
1947 births
Living people
Charter 77 signatories
Czech activists
Mayors of places in the Czech Republic
Czech philanthropists